Nellu is a 2010 Indian Tamil language drama  film written and directed by M. Shiva Shankar. It stars Sathya and debutante Bhagyanjali in the lead roles, while Senthil Rajan has handled the camera and S. S. Kumaran has composed the music. The film is based on the Kilvenmani massacre incident that happened in 1968.

Plot
This film also speaks about the caste differences between the landlords and the farmers.

Cast
 Sathya as Kathir
 Karthik Jai as the tea stall owner
 Anjali Aneesh Upasana (Bhagyanjali)
 Varsha
 OAK Sundar as a village landlord
 Kaali Venkat as Kaalimuthu
 Vasu Vikram
 Ranjan
 Singamuthu as an astrologer
 Bonda Mani
 Crane Manohar

Soundtrack
The music of the film is composed by S. S. Kumaran. Lyrics are penned by Thamarai and Na. Muthukumar.

Reception 
Malathi Rangarajan of The Hindu opined that "The subject is interesting, but treatment goes awry". A critic from The New Indian Express wrote that "'Nellu' could have been a poignant depiction of a relevant issue and happening. But the director lets go the chance".

References

External links
 

2010 films
2010s Tamil-language films